Michal Šafařík (24 January 1977 – 19 November 2020) was a Czech professional ice hockey player.

He played with HC Slovan Bratislava in the Slovak Extraliga, where won a national championship.

Šafařík died on 19 November 2020, aged 43.

Honours 

Source: 

VHK Vsetín
 Czech national ice hockey championship (Czech Extraliga)
  – 1996/1997, 1997/1998, 1998/1999, 2000/2001

HC Slovan Bratislava
 Slovak national ice hockey championship (Slovak Extraliga)
  – 2002/2003

HC Hamé Zlín
 Czech national ice hockey championship (Czech Extraliga)
  – 2003/2004

References

Sources
EuroHockey.net 

1977 births
2020 deaths
HC Slovan Bratislava players
Place of death missing
Czech ice hockey defencemen
People from Vsetín
Sportspeople from the Zlín Region
Czech expatriate ice hockey players in Slovakia
LHK Jestřábi Prostějov players
HC Havířov players
HC Chrudim players
HC Olomouc players
VHK Vsetín players
HC Kometa Brno players
PSG Berani Zlín players